Katasumi (In a Corner) and 4444444444 (Ten Fours) are two 1998 short Japanese horror films both directed by Takashi Shimizu, forerunners to the Ju-on series.

Plots

Scratch 1: Katasumi
The story of two school girls Hisayo Yoshida and Kanna Murikami who have the task of caring for and feeding their school's pet rabbits. They are sweeping out the cages and feeding the rabbits when Kanna suddenly cuts her hand, and Hisayo leaves her to go into the school and fetch a bandage. When she returns, Kanna is nowhere to be found, the rabbit cages are empty, and bits of blood and fur are strewn about. Hisayo then sees something that looks like a crawling woman (Kayako Saeki) begin to move towards her from the far side of the backyard. As she backs into a corner, she finds the body of Kanna amongst the debris from the damaged rabbit cages. She holds a trowel up defensively in front of herself while Kayako closes in upon her. Kanna then moves her bloody, jawless head, and looks on as the frightened Hisayo cowers in the corner and waits. The screen fades to black and Hisayo's fate is left ambiguous.

4444444444
4444444444 opens with a young man (revealed to be named Tsuyoshi Murakami in the first Ju-on film) riding his bicycle home. As he rounds a corner in front of an apparently abandoned house, he begins to hear a cell phone ringing, though he cannot see it. He hunts through a garbage pile next to the darkened entrance to the building, finding the phone after several rings. Upon closer examination, the phone is displaying an incoming call from the number 4444444444 (the number "4" is symbolic of bad luck in many Asian cultures, a phenomenon that is known as tetraphobia). Tsuyoshi answers the phone only to hear rasping, cat-like sounds issue from the earpiece. After unsuccessfully attempting to communicate with the unknown caller, he hangs up.

Seconds later, the phone rings again, and again he answers. Tsuyoshi is getting frustrated at this point, and begins to look a little worried, as though someone might be playing a joke on him. As he sits on the steps in front of the deserted house, he continues to try to identify the caller. Looking around nervously, he asks, "Are you... Watching me?"  Suddenly, a voice replies, "I am", though it does not come from the phone. Tsuyoshi turns slowly to see a pale boy (Toshio) beside him, drumming white fingers on his knees. Tsuyoshi looks startled, and the camera lingers on Toshio for a moment before zooming in quickly while he opens his mouth in a cat-like scream as a black tar-like substance drips from it.

Cast

Katasumi
 Ayako Omura as Hisayo Yoshida (as Ayako Oomura) 
 Kanna Kashima as Kanna Murakami
 Takako Fuji as Kayako Saeki

4444444444
 Kazushi Ando as Tsuyoshi Murakami
 Daiki Sawada as Toshio Saeki

Production

Takashi Shimizu first became involved with the Ju-on saga when writer and director Kiyoshi Kurosawa, who was teaching a filmmaking class that Shimizu, then working as an assistant director, attended, was impressed by a three-minute short film Shimizu had written and directed.

When Kurosawa learned that a producer he knew had just commissioned a feature-length horror film for Kansai Telecasting Corporation, he recommended Shimizu for the job of directing one or more sections of the film. To complete this task, Shimizu wrote several scripts, each roughly thirty minutes in length, only to be asked to make two brief three minute segments (Katasumi and 4444444444), as the television movie was intended to be an anthology of short films. After being edited together, the collection of four shorts (one of which was helmed by Kurosawa) was titled Gakkô no kaidan G, which roughly translates to School Ghost Story G ("G" supposedly standing for "Great"). It was first broadcast on Kansai TV on September 27, 1998, and ran for around 70 minutes, meaning that Shimizu contributed to just under 10 percent of the finished product.

While it is often claimed that the subsequent feature-length video films Ju-on: The Curse and Ju-on: The Curse 2 are remakes of Katasumi and 4444444444, the two segments "are actually the foundations of Ju-on", according to Shimizu, and act "almost like the true prequel of the story". Katasumi, in particular, is notable for marking the first appearance of actress Takako Fuji (at this point anonymous) as Kayako Saeki, a role that she would reprise for every Ju-on production thereafter, up to The Grudge 2.

Release

US release
On May 17, 2005, Katasumi and 4444444444 were both released in the US for the first time, appearing as additional features on the unrated director's cut DVD of The Grudge. On this DVD, the short film Katasumi is retitled In a Corner.

Germany release 
On September 1, 2005, Katasumi was released in Germany for the first time.

References

External links
 

1998 films
Films directed by Takashi Shimizu
Japanese horror anthology films
Japanese short films
Japanese ghost films
1998 horror films
1998 short films
Ju-On
1990s Japanese films